Stewart McCallum (9 May 1927 – December 2008) was a Scottish footballer who made English football league appearances with Wrexham, Workington, Hartlepool United and Southport.

Career
Starting out at Welsh club Rhyl, McCallum signed for Wrexham in 1950. He stayed there until 1953 before moving to non-league Kettering Town.

McCallum would return to the English football league with Workington, however he would only make 10 appearances before moving to Coventry City, where he did not make a single league appearance.

After short stints at Hartlepool United and Southport, McCallum would move back to the Welsh league with Holyhead Town

References

1927 births
2008 deaths
Scottish footballers
Association football wing halves
Rhyl F.C. players
Wrexham A.F.C. players
Kettering Town F.C. players
Workington A.F.C. players
Coventry City F.C. players
Hartlepool United F.C. players
Southport F.C. players
People from Bearsden
English Football League players